The education system in Honduras is characterized by five stages of formal education; PrePrimary, Primary, Middle, Secondary, and Tertiary. Public education in Honduras is provided free for children aged 6 to 15 where it is mandatory for children to attend at the primary level (Age 6 to 12). The Honduran Constitution moreover stipulates that parents have the right to choose the education ; whether free or private, of their children.

World Bank statistics put the adult literacy rate (% of people ages 15 and above) of Honduras at 83.6%. However, UNESCO statistics reveal a 12% repeater rate, and only an 80% progression and completion rate in primary education. Moreover, only 64.5% enroll for secondary education.

Poverty 

Poverty is rife in Honduras, with the poverty headcount ratio at national poverty line standing at 60% as of 2010. In typical situations, children have to quit school permanently to work at an early age to help support their families. Even though school is fully state-subsidized up till the 5th grade, many children are still unable to attend school because their families can not afford to buy uniforms and school supplies. A study conducted in 2006 by National Institute of Statistics estimated that as many as 368,000 of the 1.7 million children ages five to 12 did not receive schooling in that year.

Gender inequality 
Honduras is a patriarchal society, and males are favoured over females when it comes to education. While parents may send both genders to primary school; the females are likely the first to be withdrawn to help at home and made to work to provide income. This is further supported by the belief that occupational opportunities resulting from education are greater for males, as females have greater difficulty in finding jobs that match their academic credentials even if they have the same education level. Both genders have equal access to the limited available educational facilities; however, attendance rates for females were slightly lower than for males.

Education infrastructure 
The quality of the curriculum in Honduran public schools is poor, evidenced by the fact that for much of the last century, Honduran students were required to memorize useless or impractical data at the expense of sharpening their reasoning powers and critical thinking skills. Teachers are paid low wages, they do not have access to effective teaching materials, and they are not trained in the latest technologies and current teaching methods.
In addition, there is a scarcity of teachers, with a teacher:student ratio of 1:33 in 2008. The destruction of over 3000 schools nationwide caused by Hurricane Mitch further weakened the country’s poor education infrastructure.

References

Education in Honduras